Roksolana Mykolayivna Kravchuk (born 7 November 1997) is a Ukrainian footballer who plays as a midfielder for Women's League club WFC Zhytlobud-2 Kharkiv and the Ukraine women's national team.

Club career
Kravchuk has played for Zhytlobud-2 in Ukraine. She played for Slavia Prague in the Czech Republic.

International career
Kravchuk capped for Ukraine at senior level during the UEFA Women's Euro 2022 qualifying.

International goals

References

External links

1997 births
Living people
Ukrainian women's footballers
Women's association football midfielders
WFC Zhytlobud-2 Kharkiv players
Ukraine women's international footballers
Ukrainian expatriate women's footballers
Ukrainian expatriate sportspeople in the Czech Republic
Expatriate women's footballers in the Czech Republic
Sportspeople from Volyn Oblast
SK Slavia Praha (women) players
Czech Women's First League players